State elections were held in the Soviet occupation zone of Germany on 20 October 1946 to elect the state legislatures of Mecklenburg-Vorpommern, Brandenburg, Saxony, Saxony-Anhalt and Thuringia. They were the only elections held in the future territory of East Germany before the establishment of the German Democratic Republic in 1949, and the only free and fair elections in that part of Germany between 1932 and the Peaceful Revolution.

The Socialist Unity Party of Germany (SED), which was formed by the forced merger of the Communist Party and the Social Democratic Party in the Soviet occupation zone, became the largest party but achieved an absolute majority in only one state. The SED was created in view of the holding of elections in the Soviet zone, as a first step for future political reforms. 

In addition to the SED, three other parties participated; the Christian Democratic Union (CDU), the Liberal Democratic Party (LDP) and the Peasants Mutual Aid Association (VdgB). Two other organizations participated but only in Saxony. The SED landslide victory was seen by Soviet authorities as a justification for the development of socialism in their zone. The occupation authorities quickly dropped all pretense of liberal democracy, and by the time of the elections for a constitutional assembly in 1949, voters only had the option of approving or rejecting an SED-controlled "unity list." 

The next state elections were held in 1950, after the establishment of the German Democratic Republic.

Results

Overall

Brandenburg

Mecklenburg-Vorpommern

Saxony

Saxony-Anhalt

Thuringia

See also
States of East Germany
1946 Berlin state election (also held in East-Berlin)

References

Martin Broszat, Gerhard Braas, Hermann Weber (1993). SBZ-Handbuch, .
Mathias Tullner (1997). Zwischen Demokratie und Diktatur. Die Kommunalwahlen und die Wahlen zum Provinziallandtag in Sachsen-Anhalt im Jahre 1946, Magdeburgo, pp. 95–98.
Richard Schachtner (1956). Die deutschen Nachkriegswahlen: Wahlergebnisse in der Bundesrepublik Deutschland, in den deutschen Bundesländern, in West-Berlin, im Saarland und in der Sowjetzone (DDR) 1946-19, Isar-Verlag, Múnich, pp. 77-78.
Günter Braun: Wahlen und Abstimmungen. In: Martin Broszat, Hermann Weber (1990). SBZ-Handbuch, Oldenbourg, Múnich, pp. 397, 396 & 418.
Herbert Gottwald (1994). Der Thüringer Landtag 1946-1952. Thüringer Landtag in Verbindung mit Wartburg Verlag, Jena, pp. 56, 81 & 101.
Karl-Heinz Hajna (2000). Die Landtagswahlen 1946 in der SBZ, Peter Lang, Frankfurt am Main,   

Elections in East Germany
Soviet Occupation
Elections in Mecklenburg-Western Pomerania
Elections in Saxony
Elections in Saxony-Anhalt
Elections in Thuringia
Elections in Brandenburg
1946 elections in Germany
Soviet occupation zone